Sir Henry at Rawlinson End may refer to:

Sir Henry at Rawlinson End (album), 1978
Sir Henry at Rawlinson End (film), 1980

See also
Rawlinson End, radio broadcasts